Soraya Abdullah (3 August 1978 – 1 February 2021) was an Indonesian actress. 

Abdullah died from COVID-19  on 1 February 2021, during the COVID-19 pandemic in Indonesia.

Filmography

Cinema
Tato (1997)

Soap Operas
Kerinduan (1997)
Air Mata Terakhir (1997)
Terpikat (1999)
 (1999–2000)
 (1999–2003)
Wajah Perempuan (2000)
Kehormatan (2000–2004)
Romantika (2001)
 (2001–2005)
Lilin Kecil (2002)
 (2004–2005)
Hidayah (2005)
Misteri Ilahi

References

Actresses from Jakarta
1978 births
2021 deaths

Deaths from the COVID-19 pandemic in Indonesia